Frying Pan Shoals Light Tower is a decommissioned lighthouse located on the Frying Pan Shoals approximately  southeast of Southport, North Carolina, and  from Bald Head Island, North Carolina. The tower is currently privately owned and was formerly a bed and breakfast retreat, and is noted for its survival through several significant tropical storms.

The light tower is modeled after a steel oil drilling platform, known as a "Texas Tower", on top of four steel legs that was engineered to be used as a lighthouse housing several Coast Guard members. The  light tower marks the shoals at the confluence of the Cape Fear River and the Atlantic Ocean.

History 
The shoals have been patrolled by a lightboat since 1854 by the United States Coast Guard. In 1966, the light tower was built, and was staffed year-round by a four-person crew until the operation of the light was automated in 1979. The station was ultimately decommissioned in 2004, owing to the advent of GPS systems on ships making the facility obsolete.

The Coast Guard considered demolishing the light for use as an artificial reef, but instead held an online auction where the winning bid was by a South Carolina diving and research firm Shipwrecks, Inc. in 2009 for $515,000. However, the company failed to make the down payment, and subsequently the tower returned to government hands and was sold again in August 2010 for $85,000 to a private individual, Richard Neal of Charlotte, North Carolina.

An observational flight the day after the storm, August 28, 2011, showed that the tower had no visible damage from the impact. It was listed in an article in Time on light houses that have been restored to bed and breakfast facilities.

In November 2012, Hurricane Sandy went within a few dozen miles of the Frying Pan Tower but due to its being a low-category storm at the time, the only issue was a few disturbed ceiling tiles due to a window being left open.

In September 2018, the Shoals were in the path of Hurricane Florence. Media coverage in the hours before the storms landfall noted the American flag on Frying Pan Tower being torn to shreds by the extreme conditions as the hurricane approached. This could be seen live from an Explore.org camera on the tower. Coverage of the flag was widely viewed online, and the flag was eventually given the name Kevin by livestream viewers. After the storm passed, the flag was recovered and sold at an auction to raise money for the Wilmington Red Cross. In 2019, it went through Hurricane Dorian. As the eye passed over the structure, a weather station on the tower reported a pressure of 959.5 mb.

Starting in 2018 and finalized in 2019, Neal divested all ownership interest to focus on the restoration efforts as the director of FPTower Inc., a federally registered 501(c)3 nonprofit. FPTower Inc. is organizing the restoration with volunteers, donations, and active promotion of the tower as a resource for education, research, and as an iconic piece of American Coast Guard history.

Structural conditions 

The light tower is accessible by helicopter and by boat. A January 2010 onsite inspection by an engineering firm that was contracted by the Coast Guard determined that the helipad platform can indeed support a helicopter and that the entire structure, while in need of repair, was structurally sound. The lower stairs to the light tower were destroyed by a hurricane and the mid to upper section stairs have experienced significant deterioration due to the salt environment.

The platform on the tower consists of two floors. The subfloor is a living area of approximately  that includes seven bedrooms, kitchen, office, storage area, recreation area and toilet facilities.

References

External links 

Frying Pan Shoals Light at the Amateur Radio Lighthouse Society
Pictures of the Frying Pan Hotel

Lighthouses completed in 1964
2003 disestablishments in North Carolina
Lighthouses in North Carolina
Buildings and structures in Brunswick County, North Carolina
1964 establishments in North Carolina